This is a list of the 81 members of the European Parliament for West Germany in the 1989 to 1994 session.

List

Observers from East Germany

References

Germany
List
1989